Alfred Frederick Joseph Platte (April 13, 1890 – August 29, 1976), was an American baseball player.  He played professional baseball for 17 years from 1910 to 1926, including nine games in Major League Baseball with the Detroit Tigers during their 1913 season. He appeared in 1,755 minor league baseball games between 1910 and 1926 and had 1,983 hits for a .313 batting average.

Early years
Platte was born in Grand Rapids, Michigan, in 1890.

Professional baseball
Platte began his professional baseball career playing for the Cadillac Chiefs in the Michigan State League from 1910 to 1912. He compiled batting averages of .339 in 1911 and .346 in 1912.

He advanced to the International League, playing for the Providence Grays from 1912 to 1914. He compiled a .306 batting average in 1913. At the end of the 1913 season, Platte played for the Detroit Tigers. He made his major league debut on September 1st and appeared in his last major league game on September 18.  He appeared in nine games, five as the backup left fielder, and the rest as a pinch-hitter and pinch-runner, and compiled a .111 career batting average.  He returned to Providence in 1914 and compiled a .318 average with 23 triples in 597 at bats.

Platte continued to play in the minor leagues until 1926, including stints with the Louisville Colonels (1915-1917), Chattanooga Lookouts (1917), Kansas City Blues (1918), Omaha Rourkes (1920), and Peoria Tractors (1921-1926). His best season was 1922 when he appeared in 124 games for Peoria in the Three-Eye League and compiled a .369 batting average with 59 extra base hits, including 23 triples.

Later years
Platte died in 1976 at age 86 in Grand Rapids, Michigan.

References

Detroit Tigers players
Baseball players from Grand Rapids, Michigan
Major League Baseball left fielders
1890 births
1976 deaths
Cadillac Chiefs players
Providence Grays (minor league) players
Louisville Colonels (minor league) players
Chattanooga Lookouts players
Omaha Rourkes players
Kansas City Blues (baseball) players
Peoria Tractors players
Elmira Colonels players
Dubuque Speasmen players